Stranger Things is an American science fiction horror drama television series created by the Duffer Brothers, who also serve as showrunners and are executive producers along with Shawn Levy and Dan Cohen. Produced by Monkey Massacre Productions and Levy's 21 Laps Entertainment, the first season was released on Netflix on July 15, 2016. Its second, third, and fourth seasons followed in October 2017, July 2019, and May and July 2022, respectively. In February 2022, the series was renewed for a fifth and final season.

Set in the 1980s, the series centers around the residents of the fictional small town of Hawkins, Indiana, as they are plagued by a hostile alternate dimension known as the "Upside Down", after a nearby human experimentation facility opens a gateway between the Upside Down and the normal world. It stars an ensemble cast including Winona Ryder, David Harbour, Finn Wolfhard, Millie Bobby Brown, Gaten Matarazzo, Caleb McLaughlin, Natalia Dyer, Charlie Heaton, Cara Buono, Matthew Modine, Noah Schnapp, Sadie Sink, Joe Keery, Dacre Montgomery, Sean Astin, Paul Reiser, Maya Hawke, Priah Ferguson, and Brett Gelman.

The Duffer Brothers developed Stranger Things as a mix of investigative drama and supernatural elements portrayed with horror and childlike sensibilities, while infusing references to the pop culture of the 1980s. Several thematic and directorial elements were inspired by the works of Steven Spielberg, John Carpenter, David Lynch, Stephen King, Wes Craven and H. P. Lovecraft. They also took inspiration from experiments conducted during the Cold War and conspiracy theories involving secret government experiments.

One of Netflix's flagship series, Stranger Things has attracted record viewership on the streaming platform. The series has been critically acclaimed for its characterization, atmosphere, acting, soundtrack, directing, writing, and homages to 1980s films. It has received numerous awards and nominations.

Overview 
Stranger Things is set in the fictional rural town of Hawkins, Indiana, during the 1980s. The nearby Hawkins National Laboratory ostensibly performs scientific research for the United States Department of Energy but secretly does experiments into the paranormal and supernatural, including those that involve human test subjects. Inadvertently, they have created a portal to an alternate dimension, "the Upside Down". The influence of the Upside Down starts to affect the unknowing residents of Hawkins in calamitous ways.

The first season begins in November 1983. Will Byers is abducted by a creature from the Upside Down. His mother, Joyce; the town's police chief, Jim Hopper; and a group of volunteers search for him. A young psychokinetic girl named Eleven escapes from the laboratory and is found by friends of Will. Eleven befriends and assists them in their efforts to find Will.

The second season is set a year later in October 1984. Will has been rescued, but he begins having premonitions of the fall of Hawkins caused by a creature in the Upside Down. When it is discovered that Will is still being possessed by an entity from the Upside Down, his friends and family learn that there is a larger threat to their world.

The third season is set several months later, in the days leading up to the Fourth of July celebration in 1985. The new Starcourt Mall has become the center of attention for Hawkins residents, putting the majority of other local stores out of business due to the mall's popularity. Hopper becomes increasingly concerned about Eleven and Mike's relationship and becomes very protective of his daughter. Unbeknownst to the town, a secret Soviet laboratory underneath Starcourt seeks to open the gateway to the Upside Down. Meanwhile, the Mind Flayer uses mind control to make Billy do his bidding.

The fourth season is set several months later, in March 1986. Joyce, Will, Eleven, and Jonathan have moved to Lenora, California for a fresh start. In California, Eleven struggles with the loss of her powers and being bullied in school. Meanwhile in Hawkins, a being from the Upside Down—an entity later dubbed Vecna—begins killing the residents of Hawkins, opening new gates between the two worlds in the process. Planning to stop Vecna, Dr. Sam Owens takes Eleven to a facility to help her regain her powers. Simultaneously, Joyce and Murray fly to Russia to rescue Hopper from the Gulag in Kamchatka.

Cast and characters 

 Winona Ryder as Joyce Byers, the mother of Will and Jonathan Byers. She is divorced from Lonnie Byers, the father of Will and Jonathan. In season two, she dates her old high school classmate, Bob, until his death later in the season. She and Hopper have feelings for each other.
 David Harbour as Jim Hopper, chief of Hawkins Police Department. After his young daughter Sara died of cancer, Hopper divorced and lapsed into alcoholism. Eventually he grows to be more responsible, saving Will Byers after he is taken in season 1, as well as taking Eleven as his adopted daughter. He and Joyce have feelings for each other.
 Finn Wolfhard as Mike Wheeler, middle child of Karen and Ted Wheeler, brother of Nancy and Holly, and one of three friends of Will Byers. He is an intelligent and conscientious student and is committed to his friends. He develops romantic feelings for Eleven and later dates her.
 Millie Bobby Brown as Eleven / Jane Hopper ("El"), a teen girl with telepathic and psychokinetic abilities, a result of being one of Dr. Brenner's subjects from Hawkins National Laboratory. She escapes the lab and eventually becomes an adoptive daughter to Jim Hopper taking his surname, and adjusts to living a normal life with the help of Mike (whom she later dates) and his friends.
 Gaten Matarazzo as Dustin Henderson, one of Will Byers' friends. His cleidocranial dysplasia causes him to lisp. In the second season, he is proud of his new front teeth and is attracted to Max. In season 3, he gets a girlfriend, Suzie (portrayed by Gabriella Pizzolo), whom he met at Camp Know Where prior to the start of the season.
 Caleb McLaughlin as Lucas Sinclair, one of Will's friends. He is wary of Eleven but later befriends her. In season two, he is one of Max's love interests and eventually becomes her boyfriend in season three. He becomes more popular in season 4 as a result of joining the Hawkins High basketball team, which briefly puts him at odds with his regular friend group.
 Natalia Dyer as Nancy Wheeler, daughter of Karen and Ted and older sister of Mike and Holly. Studious and rule-abiding, Nancy finds another side of herself while investigating the Hawkins Lab and the death of her friend Barbara. In the first two seasons, she is the girlfriend of Steve Harrington but breaks up with him and then dates Jonathan Byers. She is an aspiring journalist. 
 Charlie Heaton as Jonathan Byers, the older brother of Will Byers and the son of Joyce Byers. He is a quiet and kind-hearted teenager, an outsider at school, and an aspiring photographer. He is close with his mother and brother, and he becomes the boyfriend of Nancy Wheeler.
 Cara Buono as Karen Wheeler (seasons 1–3; also starring: season 4), mother of Nancy, Mike, and toddler Holly. Karen has a brief fling with Billy in season 3.
 Matthew Modine as Martin Brenner (seasons 1 and 4; recurring: season 2), the scientist in charge of Hawkins Laboratory and training Eleven. Manipulative and remote, he and his team are searching for Eleven in season 1 after she escapes. He is referred to as "Papa" by Eleven. In season 4, he returns to help Eleven gain her powers back and protects her from the government agents hunting her down.
 Noah Schnapp as Will Byers (season 2–present; recurring: season 1), the son of Joyce Byers and younger brother of Jonathan Byers. He is captured by a monster from the "Upside Down", an alternate dimension discovered by Hawkins Laboratory scientists in season 1. He later develops a connection to the upside down and the Mind Flayer due to his capture.
 Sadie Sink as Max Mayfield (season 2–present), Billy's younger stepsister, and a tomboy who catches the attention of both Lucas and Dustin, eventually dating Lucas. In season 4, she is one of the teens that is targeted by Vecna.
 Joe Keery as Steve Harrington (season 2–present; recurring: season 1), a popular high school student and the boyfriend of Nancy Wheeler. He ostracizes Jonathan Byers but later comes to befriend him. He and Nancy later break up in season two but remain friends. He is known as the "babysitter" of the group since he is often left to look after the kids.
 Dacre Montgomery as Billy Hargrove (seasons 2–3; guest: season 4), Max's violent, unpredictable, and abusive older stepbrother. He challenges Steve's popularity. In season 3, he is controlled by the Mind Flayer and later sacrifices himself to protect the kids.
 Sean Astin as Bob Newby (season 2; guest: season 3), a former schoolmate of Joyce and Hopper who runs the Hawkins RadioShack and is Joyce's boyfriend, putting him at odds with Hopper. He dies at the end of season 2 after being attacked by Demodogs.
 Paul Reiser as Sam Owens (seasons 2 and 4; guest: season 3), a Department of Energy executive who replaces Brenner as director of Hawkins Laboratory. He is stubborn and committed to scientific research, yet empathetic to the residents of Hawkins and helps Hopper adopt Eleven as his legal daughter. He returns with Brenner in season 4 to help Eleven gain back her powers and protects her from the government agents hunting her.
 Maya Hawke as Robin Buckley (season 3–present), a girl who works alongside Steve at the ice cream store in the mall who later comes out as a lesbian. She and Steve Harrington are close friends, having worked together at the Scoops Ahoy ice cream shop and later the video store.
 Priah Ferguson as Erica Sinclair (season 3–present; recurring: season 2), Lucas's 10-year-old sister who helps the group. She is revealed to be very smart and have avid interest in D&D.
 Brett Gelman as Murray Bauman (season 4; recurring: seasons 2–3), a conspiracy theorist, private investigator, and longtime friend of Hopper's who helps Nancy and Jonathan in season 2 and Hopper and Joyce in seasons 3 and 4.
 Jamie Campbell Bower as Henry Creel / One / Vecna (season 4), a murderous psychic being from the Upside Down revealed to have created the Mind Flayer. He was born as a human named Henry Creel with psionic abilities. After murdering his family and falling into a coma, he was put under the care of Dr. Brenner. Flashbacks in season 4 reveal he was sent to the Upside Down by Eleven when she was nine years old, where he was disfigured by lightning, causing his appearance as Vecna. After exploring the Upside Down, he created the Mind Flayer and took control of the dimension.

Episodes

Production

Development 

Stranger Things was created by Matt and Ross Duffer, known professionally as the Duffer Brothers, who also serve as showrunners and head writers, as well as direct many of the episodes. The two had completed writing and producing their 2015 film Hidden, in which they had tried to emulate the style of M. Night Shyamalan. However, due to changes at Warner Bros., its distributor, the film did not see a wide release and the Duffer Brothers were unsure of their future. To their surprise, television producer Donald De Line approached them, impressed with Hiddens script, and offered them the opportunity to work on episodes of Wayward Pines alongside Shyamalan. The brothers were mentored by Shyamalan during the episode's production so that when they finished, they felt they were ready to produce their own television series.

The Duffer Brothers prepared a script that would essentially be similar to the series' actual pilot episode, along with a 20-page pitch book to help shop the series around for a network. They pitched the story to about fifteen cable networks, all of which rejected the script on the basis that they felt a plot centered around children as leading characters would not work, asking them to either make it a children's series or drop the children and focus on Hopper's investigation into the paranormal. 

In early 2015, Dan Cohen, the VP of 21 Laps Entertainment, brought the script to his colleague Shawn Levy. They subsequently invited the Duffer Brothers to their office and purchased the rights for the series, giving full authorship of it to the brothers. After reading the pilot, the streaming service Netflix purchased the whole season for an undisclosed amount; the series was subsequently announced for a planned 2016 release by Netflix in early April 2015. 

The Duffer Brothers stated that at the time they pitched to Netflix the company had already been recognized for its original programming in shows such as House of Cards and Orange Is the New Black, with well-recognized producers behind them, and were ready to start giving upcoming producers like them a chance. The brothers started casting and brought Levy and Cohen in as the other executive producers to discuss storylines, with Levy also directing for the show.

The series was originally known as Montauk. The setting was then Montauk, New York, and nearby Long Island locations. Montauk figured into a number of real world conspiracy theories involving secret government experiments. The brothers had chosen Montauk as it had further Spielberg ties with the film Jaws, where Montauk was used for the fictional setting of Amity Island. After deciding to change the narrative of the series to take place in the fictional town of Hawkins instead, the brothers felt they could now do things to the town, such as placing it under quarantine, that they really could not envision with a real location. 

With the change in location, they had to come up with a new title for the series under direction from Netflix's Ted Sarandos so that they could start marketing it to the public. The brothers started by using a copy of Stephen King's Firestarter novel to consider the title's font and appearance, and came up with a long list of potential alternatives. Stranger Things came about as it sounded similar to another King novel, Needful Things, though Matt noted they still had a "lot of heated arguments" over this final title.

To pitch the series, the Duffer Brothers showcased images, footage and music from classic 1970s and 1980s films such as E.T. the Extra-Terrestrial, Close Encounters of the Third Kind, Poltergeist, Hellraiser, Stand by Me, Firestarter, A Nightmare on Elm Street and Jaws, in order to establish the tone of the series.

Writing 
The idea of Stranger Things started with how the brothers felt they could take the concept of the 2013 film Prisoners, detailing the moral struggles a father goes through when his daughter is kidnapped, and expand it out over eight or so hours in a serialized television approach. As they focused on the missing child aspect of the story, they wanted to introduce the idea of "childlike sensibilities" they could offer, and toyed around with the idea of a monster that could consume humans. The brothers thought the combination of these things "was the best thing ever".

To introduce this monster into the narrative, they considered "bizarre experiments we had read about taking place in the Cold War" such as Project MKUltra, which gave a way to ground the monster's existence in science rather than something spiritual. This also helped them to decide on using 1983 as the time period, as it was a year before the film Red Dawn came out, which focused on Cold War paranoia. Subsequently, they were able to use all their own personal inspirations from the 1980s, the decade they were born, as elements of the series, crafting it in the realm of science fiction and horror. 

Other influences cited by the Duffer Brothers include: Stephen King novels; films produced by Steven Spielberg, John Carpenter, David Lynch, Wes Craven, and Guillermo del Toro; films such as Star Wars, Alien, and Stand by Me; Japanese anime such as Akira and Elfen Lied; and several video games including Silent Hill, Dark Souls and The Last of Us. The Duffer Brothers believe that they may have brought influences from other works unintentionally, including Beyond the Black Rainbow and D.A.R.Y.L., discovered by reviewing fan feedback on the series. Several websites and publications have found other pop culture references in the series, particularly references to 1980s pop culture. The main villain for the last seaons was inspired by the villains that scared the brothers when they watched the movies and miniseries as children: Freddy Krueger, Pinhead and Pennywise.

With Netflix as the platform, the Duffer Brothers were not limited to a typical 22-episode format, opting for the eight-episode approach. They had been concerned that a 22-episode season on broadcast television would be difficult to "tell a cinematic story" with that many episodes. Eight episodes allowed them to give time to characterization in addition to narrative development; if they had less time available, they would have had to remain committed to telling a horror film as soon as the monster was introduced and abandon the characterization. Within the eight episodes, the brothers aimed to make the first season "feel like a big movie" with all the major plot lines completed so that "the audience feels satisfied", but left enough unresolved to indicate "there's a bigger mythology, and there's a lot of dangling threads at the end", something that could be explored in further seasons if Netflix opted to create more.

Regarding writing for the children characters of the series, the Duffer Brothers considered themselves as outcasts from other students while in high school and thus found it easy to write for Mike and his friends, and particularly for Barb. Joyce was fashioned after Richard Dreyfuss' character Roy Neary in Close Encounters of the Third Kind, as she appears "absolutely bonkers" to everyone else as she tries to find Will.

Casting 

In June 2015, it was announced that Winona Ryder and David Harbour had joined the series as Joyce and as the unnamed chief of police, respectively. The brothers' casting director Carmen Cuba had suggested Ryder for the role of Joyce, which the two were immediately drawn to because of her predominance in the films of the 1980s. Levy believed Ryder could "wretch up the emotional urgency and yet find layers and nuance and different sides of [Joyce]". Ryder praised that the show's multiple storylines required her to act for Joyce as if "she's out of her mind, but she's actually kind of onto something", and that the producers had faith she could pull off the difficult role. The Duffer Brothers had been interested in Harbour before, who until Stranger Things primarily had smaller roles as villainous characters, and they felt that he had been "waiting too long for this opportunity" to play a lead, while Harbour himself was thrilled by the script and the chance to play "a broken, flawed, anti-hero character".

Additional casting followed two months later with Finn Wolfhard as Mike, Millie Bobby Brown in an undisclosed role, Gaten Matarazzo as Dustin, Caleb McLaughlin as Lucas, Natalia Dyer as Nancy, and Charlie Heaton as Jonathan. In September 2015, Cara Buono joined the cast as Karen, followed by Matthew Modine as Martin Brenner a month later. Additional cast who recur include Noah Schnapp as Will, Shannon Purser as Barbara "Barb" Holland, Joe Keery as Steve Harrington, and Ross Partridge as Lonnie, among others.

Actors auditioning for the children roles read lines from Stand by Me. The Duffer Brothers estimated they went through about a thousand different child actors for the roles. They noted that Wolfhard was already "a movie buff" of the films from the 1980s period and easily filled the role, while they found Matarazzo's audition to be much more authentic than most of the other audition tapes, and selected him after a single viewing of his audition tape. 

As casting was started immediately after Netflix greenlit the show, and prior to the scripts being fully completed, this allowed some of the actors' takes on the roles to reflect into the script. The casting of the young actors for Will and his friends had been done just after the first script was completed, and subsequent scripts incorporated aspects from these actors. The brothers said Modine provided significant input on the character of Dr. Brenner, whom they had not really fleshed out before as they considered him the hardest character to write for given his limited appearances within the narrative.

Filming 

The brothers had desired to film the series around the Long Island area to match the initial Montauk concept. However, with filming scheduled to take place in November 2015, it was difficult to shoot in Long Island in the cold weather, and the production started scouting locations in and around the Atlanta, Georgia, area. The brothers, who grew up in North Carolina, found many places that reminded them of their own childhoods in that area, and felt the area would work well with the narrative shift to the fictional town of Hawkins, Indiana.

The filming of the first season began in November 2015 and was extensively done in Atlanta, Georgia, with the Duffer Brothers and Levy handling the direction of individual episodes. Jackson served as the basis of the fictional town of Hawkins, Indiana. Other shooting locations included the Georgia Mental Health Institute as the Hawkins National Laboratory site, Bellwood Quarry, and Patrick Henry High School in Stockbridge, Georgia, for the middle and high school scenes. 

Emory University's Continuing Education Department, the former city hall in Douglasville, Georgia, the Georgia International Horse Park in Conyers, Georgia, the probate court in Butts County, Georgia, Old East Point Library and East Point First Baptist Church in East Point, Georgia, Fayetteville, Georgia, Stone Mountain Park, Palmetto, Georgia, and Winston, Georgia. Set work was done at Screen Gem Studios in Atlanta and the series was filmed with a RED Dragon camera. Filming for the first season concluded in early 2016.

After the third season finished filming, producers considered the idea of keeping the Starcourt Mall set as a permanent attraction for fans to visit, but ultimately decided against it.

The fourth season of Stranger Things was expected to consist of eight episodes, with the first episode titled "Chapter One: The Hellfire Club". Filming for the season was slated to begin in January 2020 and to last through August. With the release of a February 2020 teaser for the fourth season, the Duffers confirmed that production had started. Some filming for the fourth season took place at Lukiškės Prison and nearby in Vilnius, Lithuania. In March 2020, production was stopped due to the COVID-19 pandemic. Production resumed in September 2020.

Visual effects 
To create the aged effect for the series, a film grain was added over the footage, which was captured by scanning in film stock from the 1980s. The Duffer Brothers wanted to scare the audience, but not to necessarily make the series violent or gory, following in line with how the 1980s Amblin Entertainment films drove the creation of the PG-13 movie rating. They said such films were "much more about mood and atmosphere and suspense and dread than they are about gore", though they were not afraid to push into more scary elements, particularly towards the end of the first season. 

The brothers had wanted to avoid any computer-generated effects for the monster and other parts of the series and stay with practical effects, so they created an animatronic to play the part of the Demogorgon. However, the six-month filming time left them little time to plan out and test practical effects rigs for some of the shots. They went with a middle ground of using constructed props including one for the monster whenever they could, but for other shots, such as when the monster bursts through a wall, they opted to use digital effects. Post-production on the first season was completed the week before it was released to Netflix.

The title sequence uses closeups of the letters in the Stranger Things title with a red tint against a black background as they slide into place within the title. The sequence was created by the studio Imaginary Forces, formerly part of R/GA, led by creative director Michelle Doughtey. Levy introduced the studio to the Duffer Brothers, who explained their vision of the 1980s-inspired series, which helped the studio to fix the concept the producers wanted. Later, but prior to filming, the producers sent Imaginary Forces the pilot script, the synth-heavy background music for the titles, as well as the various book covers from King and other authors that they had used to establish the title and imagery, and were looking for a similar approach for the series' titles, primarily using a typographical sequence.

They took inspiration from several title sequences of works from the 1980s that were previously designed by Richard Greenberg under R/GA, such as Altered States and The Dead Zone. They also got input from Dan Perri, who worked on the title credits of several 1980s films. Various iterations included having letters vanish, to reflect the "missing" theme of the series, and having letters cast shadows on others, alluding to the mysteries, before settling into the sliding letters. The studio began working on the title sequence before filming, and took about a month off during the filming process to let the producers get immersed in the series and come back with more input.

Initially they had been working with various fonts for the title and used close-ups of the best features of these fonts, but near the end the producers wanted to work with ITC Benguiat, requiring them to rework those shots. The final sequence is fully computer generated, but they took inspiration from testing some practical effects, such as using Kodalith masks as would have been done in the 1980s, to develop the appropriate filters for the rendering software. The individual episode title cards used a "fly through" approach, similar to the film Bullitt, which the producers had suggested to the studio.

Music 

Michael Stein and Kyle Dixon of the electronic band Survive have composed the original soundtrack for the show, including the show's theme song. It makes extensive use of synthesizers in homage to 1980s artists and film composers including Jean-Michel Jarre, Tangerine Dream, Vangelis, Goblin, John Carpenter, Giorgio Moroder, and Fabio Frizzi. According to Stein and Dixon, the Duffer Brothers had been fans of Survive's music since the 2014 film The Guest. Once the series was green-lit, the Duffer Brothers contacted Survive around July 2015 to ask if they were still doing music; the two provided the production team with dozens of songs from their band's past to gain their interest, helping to land them the role. 

In addition to original music, Stranger Things features period music from artists including Joy Division, Toto, New Order, the Bangles, Foreigner, Echo and the Bunnymen, Peter Gabriel, and Corey Hart, as well as excerpts from Tangerine Dream, John Carpenter, and Vangelis. Some songs have been used as narrative elements, such as The Clash's "Should I Stay or Should I Go" within the first season, and Kate Bush's "Running Up That Hill" in the fourth. Some of these licensed songs saw subsequent resurgence on sales charts after the respective seasons of Stranger Things aired, notably "Running Up That Hill" and Metallica's "Master of Puppets" from the fourth season, and Limahl's "The NeverEnding Story" from the third season.

Soundtracks containing separately the original compositions and the licensed music for each season have been released by Lakeshore Records.

Release 
The first season consisted of eight one-hour-long episodes which were released worldwide on Netflix on July 15, 2016, in Ultra HD 4K. The second season, consisting of nine episodes, was released on October 27, 2017, in HDR. The third season once again consists of eight episodes, and was released on July 4, 2019. The fourth season, consisting of nine episodes, was released in two volumes on May 27 and July 1, 2022, respectively. In February 2022, Netflix renewed the series for a fifth and final season.

Shortly after the fourth season's release, viewers reported that Will's friends did not acknowledge his birthday in an episode of the season that took place on that day. The Duffers said in an interview that they could rectify the matter by changing its month, which they called "George Lucas-ing the situation", in reference to the canon changes that George Lucas had made to the original Star Wars trilogy to match what the prequel trilogy had added.. Some viewers took this to imply that scenes from earlier seasons were also being edited, including one scene where Jonathan takes discreet pictures of a pool party that Steve, Nancy, and Barbara are holding. The writers stated that "no scenes from previous seasons have ever been cut or re-edited", including this scene.

Home media 
The first season of Stranger Things was released on a Blu-ray/DVD combo pack exclusively to Target retailers on October 17, 2017, and the same for the 4K/Blu-ray combo pack on November 15, 2017, both of which includes vintage CBS-FOX VHS-inspired packaging. The second season received a similar release on November 6, 2018.

Reception

Audience viewership 
Netflix did not initially reveal subscriber viewership numbers for their original series, and Symphony Technology Group compiled data for the season based on people using software on their phones that measures television viewing by detecting a program's sound. According to Symphony, within the first 35 days of release, Stranger Things averaged ratings of around 14.07million adults between the ages of 18–49 in the United States. This made it the third most-watched season of Netflix original content in the U.S. at the time behind the first season of Fuller House and fourth season of Orange Is the New Black. In a September 2016 analysis, Netflix found that Stranger Things "hooked" viewers by the second episode of the first season, indicating that the second episode was "the first installment that led at least 70 percent of viewers who watched that episode to complete the entire first season of a show."

For the third season, Netflix revealed that the show had broken viewing records for Netflix, with 40.7million households having watched the show in its first four days, and 18.2million already watched the entire series within that timeframe. Within its first month, the third season was watched by 64million households, setting a new record for the most-watched original Netflix series.

The series is the most followed TV show on social media app TV Times history, with over 5 million followers.

Critical response 

Rotten Tomatoes gave the show an overall score of 92%, while Metacritic gave the show an overall score of 74.

Review aggregator Rotten Tomatoes gave the first season an approval rating of 97% based on 91 reviews and a weighted average rating of 8.12/10. The site's critical consensus states, "Exciting, heartbreaking, and sometimes scary, Stranger Things acts as an addictive homage to Spielberg films and vintage 1980s television." The New York Times has compared the show to Rob Reiner's Stand by Me, relating their nostalgic feel by "...finding that timeless moment where everything seemed tantalizingly, scarily new." Review aggregator Metacritic gave the first season a normalized score of 76 out of 100 based on 34 critics, indicating "generally favorable reviews".

On Rotten Tomatoes, the second season has an approval rating of 94% based on 150 reviews and an average rating of 7.86/10. The site's critical consensus states, "Stranger Things slow-building sophomore season balances moments of humor and a nostalgic sweetness against a growing horror that's all the more effective thanks to the show's full-bodied characters and evocative tone." On Metacritic, the second season has a normalized score of 78 out of 100, based on 33 critics, indicating "generally favorable reviews".

On Rotten Tomatoes, the third season has an approval rating of 89% based on 140 reviews and an average rating of 7.86/10. The site's critical consensus states, "Vibrant and charming, Stranger Things transforms itself into a rivetingif familiarsummer ride that basks in its neon-laden nostalgia without losing sight of the rich relationships that make the series so endearing." On Metacritic, the third season has a normalized score of 72 out of 100, based on 28 critics, indicating "generally favorable reviews".

On Rotten Tomatoes, the fourth season holds an approval rating of 88% based on 185 reviews, with an average rating of 7.90/10. The site's critical consensus reads, "Darker and denser than its predecessors, Stranger Things fourth chapter sets the stage for the show's final season in typically binge-worthy fashion. On Metacritic, the fourth season's two volumes have scores of 69 out of 100 based on 29 critics and 74 out of 100 based on 18 critics, both indicating "generally favorable reviews".

Stranger Things was ranked third-best TV show of the year (2016) by The Guardian and Empire. It was also included on The Atlantics best TV show of 2017 list.

Commentary 

Stranger Things gained a dedicated fan base soon after its release. One area of focus was the character of Barb, Nancy's nerdy friend and classmate who is taken and killed by the monster early in the season. According to actress Shannon Purser, Barb "wasn't supposed to be a big deal", and the Duffer Brothers had not gone into great detail about the character since the focus was on finding Will. However, many fans sympathized with the character; Laura Bradley of Vanity Fair suggested that Barb would be a similar misfit in society, and "looks more like someone you might actually meet in real life" compared to the other characters, particularly Nancy. Hashtags grew in popularity after the series' release, such as "#ImWithBarb" and "#JusticeforBarb", and several fan sites and forums were created to support her. 

Purser did not return for the second season, but the Duffer Brothers used the real-life "Justice for Barb" movement as inspiration for narrative at the start of the second season: Nancy addresses the fact "that no one ever cares about" Barb. Purser and several media outlets took her nomination as Barb for Outstanding Guest Actress in a Drama Series in the Primetime Emmy Awards as achieving "Justice for Barb", highlighting how well her character was received.

Another impact of the series has been an increased demand for Eggo waffles, as they are shown to be Eleven's favorite food in several episodes and are seen as a representation of the series. The Kellogg Company manufactures Eggo and had not been part of the production prior to the first season's release, but they recognized the market impact of the series. They provided a vintage 1980s Eggo television advertisement for Netflix to use in its Super Bowl LI commercial, and they intend to become more involved with cross-promotion. Coca-Cola released a limited run of New Coke (introduced in 1985) to coincide with the third season of the show, which takes place in 1985.

Controversies 
In April 2018, filmmaker Charlie Kessler filed a lawsuit against the Duffer brothers, claiming that they stole his idea behind his short film Montauk, which featured a similar premise of a missing boy, a nearby military base doing otherworldy experiments, and a monster from another dimension. Kessler directed the film and debuted it at the 2012 Hamptons International Film Festival. During the 2014 Tribeca Film Festival, he pitched his film to the Duffer brothers and later gave them "the script, ideas, story and film" for a larger film idea which he called The Montauk Project. Kessler contended that the Duffer brothers used his ideas to devise the premise for Stranger Things and sought a third of the income that they had made from the series. 

The Duffer brothers' lawyer stated that they never saw Kessler's film nor spoke to him regarding it, and that Kessler had no input into their concepts for Stranger Things. The judge denied summary judgment for the Duffer brothers in April 2019, allowing Kessler's suit to proceed to trial. Just before the trial was due to start in May 2019, Kessler withdrew his lawsuit after hearing the depositions and seeing documents from as early as 2010 which showed him that the Duffers had independently come up with the concept of Stranger Things.

Journalists have noted that the idea of supernatural events around Montauk had originated due to urban legend of the Montauk Project, which came to light from the 1992 book The Montauk Project: Experiments in Time.

In September 2017, multiple media outlets published articles about a cease-and-desist letter sent by a Netflix in-house attorney to the operator of a Stranger-Things-themed bar in Chicago. The letter included humorous references to the series: "unless I'm living in the Upside Down"; "we're not going to go full Dr. Brenner on you"; "the demogorgon is not always as forgiving". The letter also won praise from lawyers for its even-handedness in not demanding immediate closure of the bar, only demanding that the bar not remain open without Netflix's permission past its initial scheduled run.

In July 2022, six Jewish and Roma groups condemned Netflix's use of Lukiškės Prison as a filming location for season four of Stranger Things. Protestors pointed out the prison's involvement in the Holocaust and its role in the Ponary massacre; denounced Netflix's partnering with local tourism board Go Vilnius to rent out a refurbished Stranger-Things-themed prison cell on Airbnb; and criticized Netflix's decision to repost images of fans' Eleven-inspired numerical tattoos on their Instagram, saying it "desecrates the living memories of Holocaust survivors". A petition calling on Netflix to close the rental and apologize garnered more than 60,000 signatures, leading Go Vilnius to shut down the Airbnb listing indefinitely. Multiple news outlets reached out to Netflix, which did not comment.

Accolades 

Stranger Things has received numerous awards and nominations across the entertainment industry, including ten Primetime Emmy Award nominations and four Golden Globe Award nominations through the second season. The series' cast has received several of these: the series' first-season cast won the Screen Actors Guild Award for Outstanding Performance by an Ensemble in a Drama Series, while series leads Ryder, Brown, and Harbour have earned individual awards and nominations.

Other media

Beyond Stranger Things 
With the release of the second season of the series, Netflix also released Beyond Stranger Things, an aftershow hosted by Jim Rash. The guests are cast and crew from the series, including the Duffer Brothers and the series' stars, who discuss the development and production of the series and its larger mythology. Unlike previous aftershows created by Embassy Row, such as Talking Dead and Talking Bad, Beyond Stranger Things is intended to be watched after a screening of the entire second season.

Tie-in books 
Penguin Random House partnered with Netflix to release a series of books related to Stranger Things, starting in late 2018. These include How to Survive in a Stranger Things World, a children's book released on November 13, 2018, that offers "advice, wisdom, and warnings" from Stranger Things. They have also published the behind the scenes book Stranger Things: World Turneds Upside Down: The Official Behind-The-Scenes Companion (released on October 30, 2018), and a two-in-one Hawkins Middle School Yearbook/Hawkins High School Yearbook (released on March 26, 2019). 

Visions from the Upside Down: Stranger Things Artbook was released on October 15, 2019. Will Byers' Secret Files was released on September 24, 2019. Stranger Things: The Official Sticker Album was released on June 15, 2021. Stranger Things: The Official Coloring Book was released on June 28, 2022. A Stranger Things-themed Little Golden Book, Stranger Things: We Can Count on Eleven was released on July 5, 2022.

Insight Editions released Stranger Things Tarot Deck and Guidebook on August 16, 2022, followed by Stranger Things: The Ultimate Pop-up Book on August 30, 2022.

In the second quarter of 2019, as part of its Silver Archive series, UK publisher Obverse Books released a book on the first season of Stranger Things by writer Paul Driscoll.

Novels 
The novel Suspicious Minds by Gwenda Bond takes place before the first season and focuses on Eleven's mother Terry Ives and her experiences with Dr. Brenner in the Hawkins laboratory in 1969. The novel was released on February 5, 2019, and was soon followed by Darkness on the Edge of Town by New Zealand author Adam Christopher on May 28, 2019. In Edge, following the events of the second season, Hopper relates details of his past life in New York City during the 1970s to Eleven. Runaway Max, a young adult novel by Brenna Yovanoff, was released on June 4, 2019, and explored Max Mayfield's early life in San Diego prior to moving to Hawkins in 1984, as well as offering a retelling of events from the second season from her perspective. 

Rebel Robin a young adult novel by A.R. Capetta was released on June 29, 2021, detailing Robin Buckley's struggle to accept her identity prior to the events of Season 3. Hawkins Horrors by Matthew J. Gilbert, a collection of short scary stories told from the perspective of the Party, was released on May 3, 2022; and Lucas on the Line by Suyi Davies Okungbowa, a novel set after the events of the third season from Lucas's perspective, was released on July 26, 2022.

Comics 
Dark Horse Comics announced a partnership with Netflix for "a multi-year publishing line" of stories set in the Stranger Things world. The initial title was a four-issue miniseries written by Jody Houser and interior art by Stefano Martino. The story took place during the events of the first season and took Will's perspective while he was still trapped in the Upside Down. The first issue of the miniseries was released on September 26, 2018.

On May 4, 2019, Dark Horse Comics published a special Stranger Things comic as part of the event Free Comic Book Day (FCBD). The Dark Horse FCBD 2019 General comic contained a Stranger Things story entitled The Game Master set a few days after the events of the first season. It was written by Jody Houser and illustrated by Ibrahim Moustafa.

The second Stranger Things title is another four-part miniseries, written again by Jody Houser with interior art by Edgar Salazar, titled Stranger Things: Six. The comic focuses on one of the experiments preceding Eleven: a girl named Francine, who possesses powers of precognition. The first issue went on sale on May 29, 2019.

An original graphic novel based on the series called Stranger Things: Zombie Boys was released on February 19, 2020. It was written by Greg Pak, drawn by Valeria Favoccia, lettered by Nate Piekos of Blambot, colored by Dan Jackson, with cover art by Ron Chan. It is 72 pages and set after the first season.

A third comic miniseries, Stranger Things: Into the Fire, started in January 2020. Also lasting for four issues, it is a sequel to the Six miniseries set prior to the show's third season. It is written by Jody Houser, penciled by Ryan Kelly, and inked by Le Beau Underwood.

Another Stranger Things one-shot was released as part of Free Comic Book Day 2020. It was written by Greg Pak and set shortly after the Battle of Starcourt Mall depicted in the series' third season.

A second Stranger Things original graphic novel, titled Stranger Things: The Bully, was released on October 13, 2020. It was written by Greg Pak and illustrated by Valeria Favoccia, and focuses on the characters Troy and James concurrent with the events of the second season, as the former struggles with PTSD following his encounter with Eleven.

On June 18, 2020, it was announced that IDW Publishing and Dark Horse are co-publishing a Stranger Things and Dungeons & Dragons miniseries.

A fourth miniseries from Dark Horse, entitled Stranger Things: Science Camp started in September 2020. It also ran for four issues.

On July 23, 2020, Dark Horse announced a prequel one-shot entitled Stranger Things: Halloween in Hawkins.

A third graphic novel; Stranger Things: Erica the Great!; was released on January 26, 2022.

Collected Editions

Tabletop games 
Hasbro published a licensed version of a Stranger Things-themed Dungeons & Dragons starter kit in May 2019. The kit, besides including instruction books, character sheets and dice, includes a campaign called "The Hunt for the Thessalhydra", which the children played in the first season (written with the intent of having come from the pen of the character of Will himself) as well as Demogorgon minifigs.

Magic: The Gathering will include a series of Stranger Things crossover cards as part of its special "Secret Lair" series in 2021.

Video games

Mobile games 

Netflix and BonusXP developed a free mobile game tie-in for Stranger Things, released to iOS and Android devices on October 4, 2017. The game uses a retro-pixel style of art, similar to games for the Super Nintendo Entertainment System. The game is loosely based on the Stranger Things story after season one, with the player starting as Chief of Police Jim Hopper looking for the missing boys. Once these characters are found, they become playable and have special abilities that allow the player to access more areas in the game. 

BonusXP had less than a year to complete the game. The team decided to make the game in a similar style to The Legend of Zelda because it "was a perfect match because both [Stranger Things and Zelda] are about exploration, and it's kind of a mysterious fit that fit the mood of the show," according to BonusXP president Dave Pottinger. The map of Hawkins in the game was based on a Google street view map of Jackson, Georgia, where the series is filmed. In order to help keep the game a secret, BonusXP did not hire game testers for their quality assurance, instead having family members from the design team provide feedback; this process helped create the two difficulty levels in the game. 

Completing the game gives players a clip from the first episode of the second season of the series. The game was downloaded 3million times in the first week, becoming a top download and receiving critical praise. With the release of season two, an update to the game added Max as a playable character, and a release for the Amazon Fire TV, which included controller support. The game was nominated for "Mobile Game" at the 14th British Academy Games Awards.

A second mobile game by BonusXP, Stranger Things 3: The Game, was announced during The Game Awards 2018. It was released as a tie-in for Stranger Things third season, launching on July 4, 2019. This game is an isometric action game, where players lead selected show characters, including Joyce, Jim, Max, and Eleven, through various levels, with gameplay inspired by several video games of the 1980s. The game follows the narrative of the third season, as BonusXP has some input with the Duffer brothers, and provided additional story elements that the show does not have time to explore. The game was not only released for mobile platforms, but also personal computers, Nintendo Switch, PlayStation 4, and Xbox One.

Both of these Stranger Things mobile games were used to launch Netflix's video games service for its mobile app in November 2021.

A third mobile game, called Stranger Things: Puzzle Tales, was developed by Next Games. It was initially announced as a location-based game with role-playing game mechanics. Instead, when it was released in 2021, it was instead a story-driven puzzle role-playing game.

PlayStation VR game 
Sony Interactive Entertainment has announced that it is working on a PlayStation 4-exclusive game, based on Stranger Things, for their PlayStation VR peripheral. The company has since released a teaser showing the Christmas-lights-on-a-wall scenes.

PC 
A DRM-free Windows and Mac game based on Season 3 was released on July 4, 2019.

Cancelled Telltale game 
In June 2018, Netflix announced plans for Telltale Games to produce an episodic adventure game based on the series, as part of a larger partnership that would see ports of other Telltale series as interactive movies on Netflix. However, the project was cancelled after Telltale laid off the majority of its staff in September 2018. As planned, the game would have taken place in the springtime of 1985, bridging the events of the second and third season. Telltale had also commissioned a companion game from Night School Studio titled Kids Next Door that would be a precursor to their title, but this also was cancelled on Telltale's closure.

Podcasts 

In July 2019, a three episode Behind The Scenes: Stranger Things 3 podcast was released, taking a look at the making of the show's third season. It was hosted by Dan Taberski.

A six-episode scripted podcast companion to the Rebel Robin novel, entitled Rebel Robin: Surviving Hawkins, was released in mid-2021. Maya Hawke reprises her role as Robin, Sean Maher plays her favorite teacher Mr. Hauser, and Lauren Shippen writes and directs.

Stranger Things Experience 

From 16 to 19 June 2022, Netflix South Africa partnered with Fourways Mall to operate the Stranger Things Experience. The Experience previously operated at the Canal Walk Mall in Cape Town.

Stage play and spinoff series 
In July 2022, it was revealed that a spin-off stage play and a spinoff series was in the works. The stage play will be produced by Sonia Friedman and Stephen Daldry. On March 1, 2023, it was announced as Stranger Things: The First Shadow, written by Kate Trefry, which will premiere in late 2023 at the Phoenix Theatre.

In December 2022, it was revealed to be an anime series spinoff titled Stranger Things: Tokyo.

Others 
Lego introduced a Stranger Things set called "The Upside Down", based on a version of the Byers' home and its replica in the Upside Down, in May 2019. In 2020, The Upside Down set was awarded "Toy of the Year" and also "Specialty Toy of the Year" by the Toy Association. Netflix partnered with Epic Games to include some elements of Stranger Things as cosmetics in Fortnite Battle Royale in the weeks preceding the show's third season launch. Stranger Things DLC for the VR game Face Your Fears was also released. Within a September 17, 2019, update for the asymmetric multiplayer horror game Dead by Daylight, the Demogorgon was released as one of the killers, along with Nancy Wheeler and Steve Harrington as survivors. The chapter was later removed on November 17, 2021. Stranger Things-themed vehicles and cosmetics were added to Rocket League for its 2019 Halloween event. In the MOBA SMITE, a number of Stranger Things-themed character skins were created and released as part of a crossover Battle Pass, such as Starcourt Eleven Scylla, Hopper Apollo, The Demogorgon Bakasura and The Mind Flayer Sylvanus.

United States Representative David Cicilline compared the state of the nation during the presidency of Donald Trump to that of Stranger Things during a speech given in Congress on February 16, 2017, using a sign "Trump Things" in the same format as the title card of the series and saying "Like the main characters in Stranger Things, we are now stuck in the Upside Down".

As part of its release on Netflix on April 14, 2017, the cast of the rebooted version of Mystery Science Theater 3000 riffed on the first part of "Chapter 1" of Stranger Things. Google used augmented reality (AR) "stickers" of Stranger Things characters to introduce its ARCore technology announced alongside its Pixel 2 phone in October 2017. Sesame Street created a young audience-appropriate spoof of Stranger Things, called Sharing Things, released in November 2017; it featured Cookie Monster as the "Cookiegorgon", Grover as Lucas, Ernie as Dustin, and included several nods to the narrative of the second season. 

The Simpsons episode "Treehouse of Horror XXX", which aired on October 20, 2019, included the segment Danger Things, a parody of Stranger Things. The classic 1980s bicycles used in the series have been produced in limited runs that sell out quickly. The mobile game The Seven Deadly Sins: Grand Cross had a Strangers Things crossover event and the story followed the characters being transported to the universe of the anime. The Stranger Things characters could be unlocked for a limited time.

References

External links 

 
 
 
 Analysis of the Duffer Brothers' "show bible" from Screencraft.org

 
2010s American drama television series
2010s American horror television series
2010s American LGBT-related drama television series
2010s American science fiction television series
2020s American drama television series
2020s American horror television series
2020s American LGBT-related drama television series
2020s American science fiction television series
2016 American television series debuts
English-language Netflix original programming
Fiction about monsters
Fictional government investigations of the paranormal
Horror drama television series
Primetime Emmy Award-winning television series
Saturn Award-winning television series
Serial drama television series
Television shows about telekinesis
Television series about bullying
Television series about parallel universes
Television series about the Cold War
Television series set in 1983
Television series set in 1984
Television series set in 1985
Television series set in 1986
Television series set in the 1980s
Television shows filmed in Atlanta
Television shows set in Indiana
Television shows set in the Midwestern United States
Works based on Dungeons & Dragons